Watch the Ride may refer to:
Watch the Ride (Zinc album), 2007
Watch the Ride, a 2008 album by TC (musician)
Watch the Ride, a 2008 album by High Contrast
Watch the Ride, a 2008 album by Goldie
Watch the Ride, a 2008 album by Skream